The BB Microlight BB-two seater is a Hungarian ultralight trike, designed and produced by BB Microlight of Baja, Hungary. The aircraft is supplied as a kit for amateur construction or as a complete ready-to-fly-aircraft.

Design and development
It is marketed in the United States in the Light-sport Aircraft category as an ELSA by Manta Aircraft.

The aircraft features a cable-braced hang glider-style high-wing, weight-shift controls, a two-seats-in-tandem open cockpit, tricycle landing gear with wheel pants and a single engine in pusher configuration.

The aircraft is made from bolted-together aluminum tubing, with its double surface wing covered in Dacron sailcloth. Its  span wing is supported by a single tube-type kingpost and uses an "A" frame weight-shift control bar. The standard powerplant is a twin cylinder, air-cooled, two-stroke, dual-ignition  Rotax 503 engine, with the liquid-cooled  Rotax 582 and the two cylinder, air-cooled, four-stroke, dual-ignition  HKS 700E engines optional.

A number of different wings can be fitted to the basic carriage, including the US-made 40% double surface Manta RST and the 80% double surface Manta Orca 12 RST. The Hungarian-made  BB Microlight BB-02 Serpa or the  BB Microlight BB-01 Bence are also available.

Specifications (BB-two seater with Serpa wing)

References

External links

2000s Hungarian sport aircraft
2000s Hungarian ultralight aircraft
Homebuilt aircraft
Single-engined pusher aircraft
Ultralight trikes
BB Microlight aircraft